Point Pleasant School is a historic one-room school building located at Laurel Fork, Carroll County, Virginia. It was built in 1911, and is a one-story, weatherboarded, frame building with a rectangular footprint measuring approximately 34 feet by 37 feet.  It has a steeply pitched hipped roof that is nearly pyramidal.  The school closed in 1948–1949.

It was added to the National Register of Historic Places in 2007.

References

One-room schoolhouses in Virginia
School buildings on the National Register of Historic Places in Virginia
School buildings completed in 1911
Buildings and structures in Carroll County, Virginia
National Register of Historic Places in Carroll County, Virginia
1911 establishments in Virginia